The DeepFlight Super Falcon is a personal submarine designed by Graham Hawkes, a former civilian ocean engineer. It was hoped that the technology used in this submersible would allow travel to the deepest parts of the ocean.

Development 

The Super Falcon was designed by Graham Hawkes. Later, he started designing submersible vehicles for both the oil industry and those in the scientific research sectors. One of his earlier submersibles was featured in the James Bond film For Your Eyes Only. Another was used in producer James Cameron's Aliens of the Deep.

In 2005, Hawkes and adventurer Steve Fossett teamed up to create a submarine that could be piloted by an individual to the deepest part of the ocean. This spot in the Pacific Ocean, called Challenger Deep, is approximately  under the ocean's surface and is thought to be the deepest point in the ocean. Together they began to develop the Challenger submersible with this goal in mind. However, in 2007 Fossett lost his life in a fatal accident in the Sierra Nevada Mountains of California before the feat could be attempted.

The first test flight of the Super Falcon in 2009 ran into a few problems including getting the submersible stuck in a kelp bed, which had to be cut free with the help of a safety diver. Other initial problems included a broken prop and rudder while performing vertical dives and 90 degree rolls.

Design

Mark I
The Super Falcon is classified as a winged submersible with a numerical design designation of DF 302.

The maximum rate at which it can make a descent is 200 ft/min and the maximum rate at which it can ascend is 400 ft/min.

Mark II
It can carry a crew of 2, and a payload of  including the crew. The vehicle uses lithium ion batteries for energy storage.

Submarines 

The Mateschitz Super Falcon is a Mark II custom fitted to Red Bull billionaire Dietrich Mateschitz, for use at the island and resort that he owns, Laucala Island in Fiji. It is the first resort-based Super Falcon.

References

External links 

 
 by Thayer Walker - Outside Online May 2010

Submarines
Personal submarines